Class of 3000 is an American animated musical television series created by André 3000 (best known as a member of the hip hop duo Outkast) for Cartoon Network. The series follows superstar and music teacher Sunny Bridges (voiced by 3000), who teaches a group of students at Atlanta, Georgia's Westley School of Performing Arts. Bridges is a jazz and blues artist who occasionally lectures in Atlanta's Little Five Points residential area. Both OutKast and Cartoon Network are based in Atlanta. 28 episodes were produced.

Class of 3000 was produced by Tom Lynch Company, Moxie Turtle, and Cartoon Network Studios. It is also the final Cartoon Network original series to premiere when Jim Samples was Cartoon Network's General Manager and Executive Vice President, as he later resigned following the 2007 Boston Mooninite panic.

Characters

Production
While on a trip to Turner Broadcasting to pitch projects, Thomas Lynch met with vice president of programming for Cartoon Network Mike Lazzo, an old friend of his. Lynch told him he wanted to make an animated series with music, and Lazzo said he had a pilot.

While discussing ideas, the two realized their shared fondness for Outkast's album Speakerboxxx/The Love Below and contacted André 3000 to turn his The Love Below into an animated show for Adult Swim. André however was uninterested in the idea and instead proposed coming up with an original concept. Wanting to avoid the show turning into Hammerman or The Jackson 5ive, André decided to become directly involved with development and not have it become "a licensing deal". His only stipulation was that the show must be set in Atlanta, as no cartoon prior had been set in the city and he wanted to showcase its culture to a wider audience.

Unsure of where to take the project, Lazzo and André took a trip to Atlanta where they visited André's childhood neighborhood Bankhead and then where he enrolled at Sutton Middle School on the other side of town in the wealthy Buckhead area. 

"André started talking about his youth ... It was two completely different worlds. His mom insisted he get a great education, so she got his transportation arranged. As I’m listening to all this I’m thinking, ‘André, this is the show I want to see." - Mike Lazzo

Development of the series lasted two and a half years. 2D animation veteran Joe Horne was attached as director. As neither Lynch or André had experience in the animation industry, Lynch told Horne he would have to "teach [us]". Lynch admitted to "making every mistake anybody could make" for his first animated project. 

"I think my worst [mistake] was when the cut came back [from overseas animation]. I looked at it and said, Okay, I have some rewrites. They said, "Uhhh, you get some retakes." I had thought retakes meant whole scenes, but it was only moments or close-ups. That was an education right there, because in live-action I rewrite all the way through post-production, I change everything all the time." - Thomas Lynch

The main characters were inspired by people André knew as a child. He related how on one occasion he was telling stories from his childhood to Lynch, who responded "Oh, that's it! There's a character right there." Diversity was an important element from André's experience that he wanted to incorporate as well: "I'm in school with the mayors kids, my friends were East Indian, people from France. I was getting all kinds of influences and I thought it would be cool to have these different types of characters, different nationalities coming together as music." André also wanted to use the show to highlight music programs, which he lamented were being removed from schools in the United States at the time. Inspiration for the series' premise came from Dead Poets Society.

"One of my favorite movies is Dead Poets Society, and I felt like doing that with kids. I also thought it’d be great to have this teacher teach kids in an unorthodox way, so I stepped in as the teacher, Sunny Bridges." - André 3000

Sunny Bridges' character was inspired by Sonny Rollins, who became well-known for taking a hiatus from performing live concerts to practice under the Williamsburg Bridge. By this point, the series had shifted from being "dark and sexy" to "a regular type of show" according to Lynch. In light of this direction, Michael Ouweleen suggested moving it to a primetime slot on Cartoon Network, which they agreed to.

The series was planned to begin featuring guest musicians after several seasons, including Big Boi, Gwen Stefani, Pharrell or Snoop Dogg among others.

Art direction
Lynch and André were familiar with Cartoon Network's other series, like Hi Hi Puffy AmiYumi, and wanted to give the show "a flowy kind of look" in contrast to their more "boxy and squarey" style. The pair struggled to find the right character designer, which they attributed to them being "very focused on what we want, but we didn't [speak] their language. They had to interpret what we were asking for." André wanted the characters to look "cool and original" and have "a lyricism, a movement and body style almost like musical notes." Eighteen designers in total were brought in to draw the main characters before David Colman was selected. 

Valerio Ventura, who worked on visual development for Disney movies like The Rescuers Down Under, served as supervising art director. Ventura was also responsible for painting the show's "jazzy spotted backgrounds" as described by Animation World Network, which, according to Lynch, "he put the (not-quite) finished art on a table, and ... literally threw paint across them Jackson Pollock-style".

Each episode of the series contains an original song with an accompanying animated music video, which André likened to "mini-Fantasias". The music videos are directed by guest animators and feature styles different from the rest of the show. Artists "were given free reign " and "staying on model was strictly optional" according to Lynch. Several artists who directed music videos include John Kricfalusi, Bill Sienkiewicz, Kyle Baker, Jorge Gutierrez, Peter Chung and Charlie Bean.

Cast
The series features several veteran voice actors for the main cast, including Tom Kenny (Eddie), Phil LaMarr (Philly Phil), Jennifer Hale (Madison), Janice Kawaye (Kim & Kam) and Jeff Bennett (Principal Luna). André described his first recording session with the other actors as "intimidat[ing]" until they helped coach him and "become a little more whimsical and magical". The leading role of Lil' D was given to "Small Fire", a local Atlanta comedian who grew up in André's neighborhood and was "the local tomboy [who] would beat us in basketball." He had her in mind for the role from the beginning and finding her was "relatively simple"; his mom went over to her mom's house and asked where she was.

Cancellation
Class of 3000 was cancelled in December 2007 partially due to budget constraints, low ratings and scheduling conflicts of André submitting his songs for the show by deadline.

Mike Lazzo (who had left Cartoon Network to become senior executive vice president of Adult Swim after Class of 3000 was greenlit) also noted it was a victim of a regime change at Cartoon Network, which began following Jim Samples resignation earlier that year over the 2007 Boston Mooninite panic. Because of this, Class of 3000 has not been seen in reruns nor transferred on Boomerang.

Episodes

Series overview

Season 1 (2006–07)

Season 2 (2007–08)

Music
Every episode of the show features at least one original song performed by the characters, which were written to fit the story.

André 3000 listed Peanuts and Fat Albert and the Cosby Kids as inspirations for the show's musical style, saying:

"I watched Peanuts growing up, and the music was always strong. Vince Guaraldi, a great jazz artist, was doing all the music for Peanuts. And at the time ... Fat Albert and the Cosby Kids had music involved. So I was really looking for a vehicle to do music. I thought it’d be dope for kids to hear something different than what they hear every day. I wanted to expose them to different sounds, and instruments they might not be hearing … on the radio."

While recording a song, André would lay reference tracks by saying/singing lines meant for the children characters in the show before sending it to Cartoon Network for the actors to replace. André noted the difficulty of this, saying: "I’d have to change my voice to act like a kid, had to think like a kid, and that was the hardest learning curve musically. I knew I wanted to introduce kids to certain instruments and keep it upbeat. But it was a challenge to bring my inner kid out."

Regarding the show's background music, André wanted it to have an "Atlanta/southern vibe", and selected The B-52's member Pat Irwin to oversee it.

CD track list
A CD featuring songs from the first season of the show was released on July 3, 2007 via LaFace Records.

Broadcast and release
The series made its world premiere (previously advertised as a live premiere with performances by Chris Brown) on November 3, 2006 at 8:00 p.m. ET/PT with a one-hour special. It was Cartoon Network's highest rated premiere since Foster's Home for Imaginary Friends in 2004 and ranked #1 in all of television for boys 2-11 and boys 6-11. It later premiered on Cartoon Network UK on May 28, 2007 and Cartoon Network Australia/New Zealand on February 4, 2008.

Although there have been no home video releases in Region 1, the show is available on Google Play, with the exception of "The Cure" from season two.

Home media
A DVD of the first season was released on April 17, 2008, in Region 4. Plus, in the UK, 3 episodes from the series were placed on a DVD.

Reception
The show received mostly positive reviews. The New York Times called it "an eclectic, speedy and fun-enough cartoon that combines styles from anime, shimmying iPod ads and the merrily slapdash work of Filmation in the 1970s." Regarding André 3000's influence, they said "[his] energizing music combines funk and crunk and every other style, knows from cacophony, and the show... is kept under control with witty, pointed dialogue and kid-friendly punch lines about, say, Clay Aiken or Big Pharma." The Boston Globe also described the series as "both sweetly innocent and urban contemporary" and that it "offers music as something spiritual and celebratory and not to be made just for money". Emily Ashby of Common Sense Media gave the series four out of five stars, saying: "Class of 3000 offers a rich cast of diverse characters, colorful animation, and fun (if sometimes somewhat far-fetched) storylines. ... In addition to his creative responsibilities, Benjamin also contributes original songs and music videos to each episode (a tie-in album is available) -- the entire package may just leave your kids with a renewed interest in music."

"Eddie's Money" won a Primetime Emmy for Outstanding Individual Achievement in Animation.

The soundtrack is rated 4.5 stars out of 5 on Amazon.

In other media
 Sunny Bridges made a cameo appearance during the end credits of Codename: Kids Next Door and The Grim Adventures of Billy & Mandy crossover episode "The Grim Adventures of the KND".
 Sunny Bridges makes a cameo in the OK K.O.! Let's Be Heroes final episode "Thank You for Watching the Show".

References

External links
 
 
 

2000s American animated television series
2000s American black cartoons
2000s American musical comedy television series
2000s American school television series
2006 American television series debuts
2008 American television series endings
American children's animated comedy television series
American children's animated musical television series
Animation based on real people
Cartoon Network original programming
Television series by Cartoon Network Studios
English-language television shows
Middle school television series
Animated television series about children
Television series about educators
Television shows set in Atlanta